Lena Petermann (born 5 February 1994) is a German football striker, currently playing for Montpellier in the Division 1 Feminine.

Club career
Petermann started her club career at Hamburger SV. In 2013, she moved to the United States to play college football (soccer) for the UCF Knights in Florida, where in her first year she was named the Conference rookie of the year.

After a successful campaign with Germany women's national under-20 football team at the 2014 U-20 Women's World Cup she had an opportunity and decided to move back to Germany to pursue a professional career, by joining SC Freiburg.

International career
As an under-17 international she played the UEFA Women's Under-17 Championship in 2010 and 2011. As well as the 2010 FIFA U-17 Women's World Cup, where she scored five goals.

She also played for Germany women's national under-20 football team and was part of the winning team of the 2014 FIFA U-20 Women's World Cup where she scored three goals. The first was in a 2–0 victory against the United States at the group stage, she scored the first goal of that match. Her second goal came during the semifinal against France, with the scores at 1–1 and France dominating the match, she scored the winning goal (2–1) at the 81st minute. Her third goal was the title winning goal during the 1–0 triumph over Nigeria, scored at the 98th minute during the match extra-time.

Petermann made her debut for the senior German team on 6 March 2015 at the Algarve Cup against China. She was part of the German squad of the 2015 FIFA Women's World Cup in Canada, where she scored her first two goals for Germany, both came at the group stage 4–0 win match against Thailand.

Career statistics

International

International goals
Scores and results list Germany's goal tally first:

Honours

International
Germany U20
FIFA U-20 Women's World Cup: Winner 2014

References

External links

Profile  at DFB
Player German domestic football stats  at DFB
U-20 Profile  at DFB
U-17 Profile  at DFB
Profile at UCF Knights

1994 births
Living people
People from Cuxhaven
German women's footballers
German expatriate women's footballers
Women's association football forwards
Hamburger SV (women) players
Germany women's international footballers
2015 FIFA Women's World Cup players
SC Freiburg (women) players
UCF Knights women's soccer players
Frauen-Bundesliga players
Footballers from Lower Saxony
Division 1 Féminine players
Montpellier HSC (women) players
1. FFC Turbine Potsdam players
Expatriate women's footballers in France
Expatriate women's soccer players in the United States
German expatriate sportspeople in France
German expatriate sportspeople in the United States
UEFA Women's Euro 2017 players